This House Is Not for Sale – Live from the London Palladium is the third live album by American rock band Bon Jovi. It was released on December 16, 2016, by Island Records. The album contains live versions of 15 of the 21 songs from Bon Jovi's thirteenth studio album, This House Is Not for Sale, recorded at the London Palladium, London, on October 10, 2016.

Track listing

Personnel
Bon Jovi
Jon Bon Jovi – lead vocals
Phil X – lead guitar, pedal steel, backing vocals
Hugh McDonald – bass, backing vocals
Tico Torres – drums, percussion
David Bryan – keyboards, piano, backing vocals

Additional personnel
John Shanks – rhythm guitar, backing vocals
Everett Bradley – percussion, backing vocals

References

External links 
 

2016 live albums
Bon Jovi live albums
Island Records live albums